The Women's National Basketball Association's Coach of the Year is an annual Women's National Basketball Association (WNBA) award given since the league's inaugural season. The winner is selected at the end of regular season by a panel of sportswriters from the United States, each of whom casts a vote for first, second and third place selections. Each first-place vote is worth five points; each second-place vote is worth three points; and each third-place vote is worth one point. The person with the highest point total, regardless of the number of first-place votes, wins the award.

Seven coaches have won both this award and the WNBA Finals in the same season: Van Chancellor (1997–1999), Bill Laimbeer (2003), John Whisenant (2005), Brian Agler (2010), Cheryl Reeve (2011), Sandy Brondello (2014), and Becky Hammon (2022).

Winners

See also

 List of sports awards honoring women

References

Notes

Coach
Basketball coaching awards in the United States
Awards established in 1997